The AFC U-19 Women's Championship 2009 was the fifth edition of the AFC U-19 Women's Championship. It was held from August 1 to 12 in Wuhan, China. The top 3 teams qualified for the 2010 FIFA U-20 Women's World Cup.

Qualification

Qualified teams 
Direct entry
  (Defending champions)
  (2007 runners-up)
  (2007 3rd place)

Via qualification
 : Qualification Group A winners
 : Qualification Group A runner-up
 : Qualification Group B winners
 : Qualification Group B runner-up
 : Qualification Group A third-placed

Venues 
 Xinhua Road Sports Center
 Hankou Cultural Sports Centre

Seeding

Group stage 
The draw for the AFC U-19 Women's Championship 2009 took place in Kuala Lumpur on February 27, 2009.

 All times are China standard time (UTC+8).

Group A

Group B

Knockout stage 
All times are China standard time (UTC+8)

Semi-finals

Third-place play-off

Final

Winners

Awards

Goalscorers

See also 
 2010 FIFA U-20 Women's World Cup
 AFC U-16 Women's Championship 2009

References

External links 
 Official website
 rsssf.com; Tournament results

 
Women
2009 in Chinese football
2009
2009
AFc
2009 in Japanese women's football
2009 in South Korean football
2009 in North Korean football
2009 in Taiwanese football
2009–10 in Australian women's soccer
2009 in Vietnamese football
2009 in Thai football
2009 in youth association football